Roy Mathias (born 2 September 1949) is a Welsh dual-code international rugby union and professional rugby league, and footballer who played in the 1960s, 1970s and 1980s.

Background
Mathias was born in Llanelli, Wales.

Rugby union career
Mathias won a cap playing Right-Wing, i.e. number 14 for Wales (RU) while at Llanelli RFC in the 11–6 victory over France at Cardiff Arms Park on Saturday 4 April 1970.

Rugby league career

International honours
Mathias won caps for Wales (RL) while at St. Helens in the 1975 Rugby League World Cup against France, England, Australia, New Zealand, Australia, New Zealand, and France, and won a cap for Great Britain (RL) while at St. Helens in 1979 against Australia.

World Club Challenge Final appearances
Roy Mathias played , i.e. number 5, in St. Helens' 2–25 defeat by the 1975 NSWRFL season premiers, Eastern Suburbs Roosters in the unofficial 1976 World Club Challenge at Sydney Cricket Ground on Tuesday 29 June 1976.

Challenge Cup Final appearances
Roy Mathias played , i.e. number 5, in St. Helens' 20–5 victory over Widnes in the 1976 Challenge Cup Final during the 1975–76 season at Wembley Stadium, London on Saturday 8 May 1976.

County Cup Final appearances
Roy Mathias played as an interchange/substitute, i.e. number 15, (replacing  Gary Bottell) in St. Helens 0–16 defeat by Warrington in the 1982 Lancashire County Cup Final during the 1982–83 season at Central Park, Wigan on Saturday 23 October 1982.

BBC2 Floodlit Trophy Final appearances
Roy Mathias played , i.e. number 5, and scored 2-tries in St. Helens' 22–2 victory over Dewsbury in the 1975 BBC2 Floodlit Trophy Final during the 1975–76 season at Knowsley Road, St. Helens on Tuesday 16 December 1975, and played  in the 7–13 defeat by Widnes in the 1978 BBC2 Floodlit Trophy Final during the 1978–79 season at Knowsley Road, St. Helens on Tuesday 12 December 1978. The record for the most tries in a BBC2 Floodlit Trophy Final is 2-tries, and is jointly held by; Roy Mathias, Peter Glynn, Gerald Dunn and Stuart Wright.

Honoured at St. Helens R.F.C.
Roy Mathias is a St Helens R.F.C. Hall of Fame inductee.

References

External links
!Great Britain Statistics at englandrl.co.uk (statistics currently missing due to not having appeared for both Great Britain, and England)
Profile at saints.org.uk

1949 births
Living people
Cardiff City Blue Dragons players
Dual-code rugby internationals
Felinfoel RFC players
Great Britain national rugby league team players
Llanelli RFC players
Rugby league locks
Rugby league players from Llanelli
Rugby league utility players
Rugby league wingers
Rugby union players from Llanelli
St Helens R.F.C. players
Wales international rugby union players
Wales national rugby league team players
Welsh rugby league players
Welsh rugby union players